The Ministry of Tolerance and Coexistence, until 2020 as Ministry of Tolerance, is a government ministry in the United Arab Emirates that is in charge of regulating and maintaining religious tolerance and coexistence between various indigenous and overseas communities in the country. Established in February 2016 in accordance with the National Tolerance Programme, the ministry was the brainchild of Dubai ruler Mohammed bin Rashid al-Maktoum. Sheikha Lubna Khalid al-Qasimi served as its inaugural minister until she was succeeded by Nahyan bin Mubarak al-Nahyan in October 2017.

References 

Politics of the United Arab Emirates
Ministerial offices